Universal Publishers is the parent publishing company of three non-fiction book imprints specializing in nonfiction, how-to, technical and academic titles (Universal-Publishers, BrownWalker Press & Dissertation.com). It originally began in 1997 as "Dissertation.com," one of the first companies to use print on-demand and PDF (Portable Document Format) e-book technologies to publish academic theses and Ph.D. dissertations for sale online. The company was founded by Jeffrey R. Young, while he was in graduate school as a way to make academic dissertations widely available to other students and researchers at a reasonable price.

The BrownWalker Press imprint was launched in 2001 to publish academic textbooks, scholarly monographs, and edited collections across a wide range of academic expertise. In 2010, BrownWalker Press added an academic conference proceeding publishing division (ConferencePaper Publisher).

In addition to worldwide distribution through Ingram Content Group, it has an independent distribution relationship for some of its titles in India with Overseas Press.

References 

Book publishing companies based in California
Academic publishing companies
Publishing companies of the United States
Publishing companies established in 1999
Companies based in Irvine, California
Book publishing companies based in Florida
Companies based in Boca Raton, Florida
1999 establishments in Florida